Edmonton Football Club was a football club based in Edmonton, London, England. Formed in 1950 by a merger of Tufnell Park and Edmonton Borough, they merged with Haringey Borough in 1973 to form Edmonton & Haringey.

History
The club was established in 1950 as a merger of Tufnell Park and Edmonton Borough (who had been groundsharing at Edmonton's Barrass Stadium since shortly after World War II) and was initially named Tufnell Park Edmonton. The new  club took Tufnell Park's place in the Isthmian League; Tufnell Park had finished bottom of the table for the two previous seasons, and the merged club finished bottom of the league for the next two seasons. After failing to be re-elected at the end of the 1951–52 season, they joined the Spartan League in 1952. After two mid-table finishes, they left the Spartan League to join the Delphian League.

In 1960 the club was renamed Edmonton. When the Delphian League's normal format was abandoned during the weather-hit 1962–63 season, the club won the hastily-arranged Western Section. They then won the league title by beating Eastern Section champions Hertford Town 5–2 on aggregate in the two-legged championship play-off. The league was disbanded at the end of the season, and like most of the other Delphian League clubs, Edmonton became members of the new Division Two of the Athenian League. They won the Division Two Cup in 1967–68 and 1968–69, and in 1969–70 the club were Division Two runners-up, earning promotion to Division One.

In 1973 Edmonton merged with Haringey Borough in 1973 to form Edmonton & Haringey, with the new club taking Edmonton's place in the Athenian League but playing at Haringey Borough's Coles Park.

Honours
Athenian League
Division Two Cup winners 1967–68, 1968–69
Delphian League
Champions 1962–63
Western Division champions 1962–63

Records
Best FA Cup performance: Third qualifying round, 1953–54, 1968–69, 1969–70

References

Defunct football clubs in England
Defunct football clubs in London
Association football clubs disestablished in 1950
1950 establishments in England
Association football clubs disestablished in 1973
1973 disestablishments in England
Sport in the London Borough of Enfield
Isthmian League
Spartan League
Delphian League
Athenian League
Edmonton, London